Ahmad Khaleel Rashid Al-Shaaban Al-Dossary (born 29 July 1970) is a Saudi Arabian former professional footballer who played as a defender.

Khaleel represented Saudi Arabia internationally as their captain at the 2000 AFC Asian Cup.

References

External links
 

1970 births
Living people
People from Dammam
Saudi Arabian footballers
Association football defenders
Ettifaq FC players
Al Hilal SFC players
Khaleej FC players
Al-Tai FC players
Saudi Professional League players
Saudi First Division League players
Saudi Arabia international footballers